Kūh-e Shah (also:Laleh zar) The king Mountain is a mountain in the central Iranian mountain range in the south east of Iran, Kerman Province. It is located in the Baft county of the Kerman Province of Iran. Elevation of this mountain is 4,384 meters at the peak.

References

Mountains of Kerman Province
Mountains of Iran